Sheikh Abu Abdullah Muhammad Jamal Ad-Deen Al-Makki Al-Amili Al-Jizzeeni (1334–1385), better known as ash-Shahid al-Awwal ("The First Martyr") or Shams Ad-Deen, was a Shi'a scholar and the author of Al-Lum'ah Ad-Dimashqiyah and. Although he is neither the first Muslim nor the first Shi'a to die for his religion, he became known as "Shahid al-Awwal" because he was probably the first Shia scholar of such stature to have been killed in a brutal manner.

Life
He was born in 734 AH (c. 1334) in Jabal 'Amel. His nisbah Al-Jizzeeni indicates that his family was also from Jizzeen in modern-day Lebanon. When Muhammad Al-Amili was 16 years old he went to study at the city of Hilla in modern-day Iraq. He returned home when he was 21. He used taqiyya to establish himself as one of the religious scholars of Damascus, using Sunni law to judge Sunnis, while covertly judging the Shia using Shia law.

Death
He was killed on Thursday the ninth of Jumada al-awwal, 786 A.H. (ca. 1385) during the reign of Sultan Barquq. His death was in accordance with the fatwa of a jurist from the Maliki madhab, which was endorsed by a jurisprudent of the Shaf'i madhab. Accusations against him included rafd, defamation of senior Islamic personages, the companions and family of Muhammad, Aisha, Abu Bakr and Umar, following the Nusayri faith, and permitting the drinking of wine.

These accusations were first brought against him by two of his former students from Jabal Amil, who were also former Twelver Shiites. One of them, Yusuf ibn Yahya, submitted a report (which included the signatures of 70 former Shiites from Jabal Amil) to the authorities detailing al-Amili's "vile doctrines and abominable beliefs."

However, according to Shia biographer al-Khwansari, al-Amili denied these charges in a letter to the governor of Damascus, protesting his love for "the Prophet and all who loved him, all the Companions without exception." He was imprisoned for one year, then beheaded by sword. His corpse was then crucified and stoned in Damascus whereby it was burned and the ashes were discarded into the air.

See also
The Five Martyrs

References

External links
 http://www.annabaa.org/nba48/aalamshia.htm and references therein.

Lebanese Shia clerics
People from Hillah
Lebanese Shia Muslims
1334 births
1385 deaths
Muslim martyrs
14th-century Arabs